Lumen was a Milan-based multi-disciplined creative and design consulting agency, founded by Pietro Rovatti and Drew Smith in 2003. Drew Smith acquired the agency in 2014, changing the name from Lumen to Smith Lumen.

History
Lumen was founded in 2003 by the Canadian-born Drew Charles Smith, a consumer branding and packaging specialist, and the Italian Pietro Rovatti, a corporate identity and branding specialist. Previously, Smith had been Creative Director at Carré Noir, Robilant & Associati and, eventually, at FutureBrand Gio Rossi Associati, while Rovatti was Senior Art Director at Sudler & Hennessey and later Creative Director at FutureBrand Giò Rossi Associati.

Corporate structure
Lumen's approach was called branding innovation and, according to its founders, this is what made the agency quickly growing internationally, by opening a branch office in London (UK) in 2006 and establishing strategic partnerships in the same year with Mildberry, the first branding network in Russia, and in 2011 with 1.618, a Hong Kong-based branding agency. At its climax in 2011, the agency had 50 employees of 18 different nationalities.

Lumen offered a wide range of services for corporate ad private clients, such as brand strategy, packaging design, corporate & brand identity, brand management, retail design, environmental design, interactive media, point of sale and merchandise design.

Clients
Lumen had worldwide-known clients from multiple business sectors, like Ferrero, AC Milan, Campari, Diageo. Autogrill, Bonduelle, Zuegg, Unilever, Club Med, Illy, Parmalat, Gancia, Sky, Bticino, Barclays, Kellogg's, Heinz, Henkel, Festina and Rolex.

Awards
Some Lumen's works have been awarded due to their style and the use of innovative materials. The project realized for the rum Zacapa Centenario Etiqueta Negra has been focused on the "emotional involvement of the material used in the packaging" (in this case, palm fibers reproducing the motif of the south-American petate on the pack): a reason that prompted the Material Connexion research institute to show the product at the "Materiali innovativi e imprese 2009" exhibition, organized under the patronage of the Chamber of Commerce of Milan at the design museum Triennale di Milano.

A list of the most notable honours the agency received when still was known as Lumen:

References

External links
Official Website (redirecting)

Branding companies
Design companies of Italy
Companies based in Milan
Design companies established in 2003
Graphic design studios